Glochidion longfieldiae, or kaema in the Rapa language, is a species of tree or shrub in the family Phyllanthaceae. It is endemic to the island of Rapa in the Austral Islands in French Polynesia. Molecular phylogenetic analysis indicates that it is extremely closely related to the tree Glochidion rapaense, which is also endemic to Rapa.

References

Flora of French Polynesia
longfieldiae
Least concern plants
Taxonomy articles created by Polbot